Patrick David "Pat" Jablonski (born June 20, 1967) is an American former professional ice hockey goaltender. Between 1989 and 1998, he played for five teams in the National Hockey League: the St. Louis Blues, Tampa Bay Lightning, Montreal Canadiens, Phoenix Coyotes, and Carolina Hurricanes.

St. Louis Blues 
Jablonski, who played junior hockey with the Windsor Spitfires of the Ontario Hockey League, was drafted by St. Louis 139th overall in the 1985 NHL Entry Draft. After three years with the Blues' farm team, the Peoria Rivermen, Jablonski was called up to the NHL at the start of the 1989–90 season and played four games with the Blues, losing all four.

He returned to Peoria until February 1991, when he replaced an injured Curtis Joseph. Jablonski shared goaltending duties with Vincent Riendeau for the remainder of the regular season, as well as for three games in a playoff series with the Minnesota North Stars.
He continued as a backup for St. Louis in the 1991–92 season.

Other teams
Jablonski was traded to the expansion Tampa Bay Lightning in June 1992, and was named the starting goaltender for their inaugural season of 1992–93. Jablonski played 42 games that season, including his only career NHL shutout; against the Ottawa Senators in November. He played 15 games for the Lightning in 1993–94 before being traded to the Toronto Maple Leafs in February 1994.

Jablonski never played in the NHL for Toronto, spending his time in the lockout-shortened 1994–95 season between their farm team in St. John's and the Chicago Wolves and Houston Aeros of the International Hockey League. He returned to the Blues as a free agent in the summer of 1995, but only played one game for St. Louis before being traded to the Montreal Canadiens in November.

After Patrick Roy was traded to the Colorado Avalanche that December, Jablonski shared goaltending duties with Jocelyn Thibault for the remainder of 1995–96 and into the beginning of the 1996–97 season.

Later career
Jablonski was traded to the Phoenix Coyotes in January 1997. In Phoenix, he saw little playing time, only playing two games as a replacement for Nikolai Khabibulin. He signed as a free agent with Carolina in August 1997, and played five games in the 1997–98 season for the Hurricanes, with most of the rest of the season spent with the IHL's Cleveland Lumberjacks.

Jablonski never played in the NHL again. He played the 1998–99 season with the Chicago Wolves of the IHL, followed by two seasons for Västra Frölunda HC in Sweden.

Career statistics

Regular season and playoffs

International

External links
 

1967 births
Living people
American ice hockey goaltenders
Carolina Hurricanes players
Chicago Wolves (IHL) players
Cleveland Lumberjacks players
Compuware Ambassadors players
Frölunda HC players
Houston Aeros (1994–2013) players
Montreal Canadiens players
Peoria Rivermen (IHL) players
Phoenix Coyotes players
Quebec Rafales players
Sportspeople from Toledo, Ohio
St. John's Maple Leafs players
St. Louis Blues announcers
St. Louis Blues draft picks
St. Louis Blues players
Tampa Bay Lightning players
Windsor Spitfires players
American expatriate ice hockey players in Canada
American expatriate ice hockey players in Sweden